Pobeda Ice Island, original Russian name остров Победы (остров = Island, Победа = Victory, meaning Pobeda Island or Victory Island), is an ice island in the Mawson Sea. This island, which exists periodically, is formed by the running aground of a tabular iceberg.

Periodic formation 
The ice island is created and vanishes periodically. It is created by the calving of an enormous block of ice from Denman Glacier, located in the eastern part of Shackleton Ice Shelf. The resulting tabular iceberg drifts northwest until it runs aground upon a shoal north of the ice shelf. The iceberg remains locked in this position there for a decade or more, until has remodeled enough to free itself from the shoal. It then drifts into the open ocean, where it breaks into fragments. These iceberg fragments eventually melt as they drift into warmer waters. The floating tongue of the Denman Glacier, fed by ice from the interior of Antarctica, advances until a new large berg is calved about every 40 to 50 years.

Data 

The term "island" is technically incorrect, since this geographic feature is in reality a tabular iceberg with nearly vertical sides and a flat top.

Laws of physics dictate that 11% of an iceberg will extend above the water level (in salt water), while the remainder will be submerged.

History 
At this position, an ice island was first sighted by the United States Exploring Expedition, led by Charles Wilkes, in February 1840. It prevented his westward passage around the Antarctic coast, and he named it Termination Land.

Douglas Mawson renamed the island Termination Ice Tongue when he encountered it on the 1911-13 Australasian Antarctic Expedition. No island was noted however at that location, when he returned during his 1929-31 BANZARE expedition.

A Soviet Expedition came across the island in 1960 and renamed it again, this time as Pobeda Ice Island, named for Soviet victory over the Axis powers in the Great Patriotic War. They even established a temporary research station on the island. Pobeda disappeared sometime in the 1970s, to be replaced by a new berg that calved in 1985. That one also disappeared in 2003 or 2004. There is currently no ice island at this location.

Pobeda Canyon 

See also 
 List of Antarctic islands south of 60° S 
 Thwaites Iceberg Tongue

External links 
 coordinates, height, station operations
 satellite map of the area
 Pobeda Station
 overview of maps

Literature 

 Bernard Stonehouse: Encyclopedia of Antarctica and the Southern Oceans. Wiley, Chichester/Hoboken 2002, S. 200 

Islands of the Southern Ocean
Landforms of the Southern Ocean
Ephemeral islands